The 79th Regiment Illinois Volunteer Infantry was an infantry regiment that served in the Union Army during the American Civil War.

Service
The 79th Illinois Infantry was organized at Mattoon, Illinois and mustered into Federal service on August 28, 1862.

The regiment was mustered out on June 12, 1865, and discharged at Camp Butler, Illinois, on June 21, 1865.

Total strength and casualties
The regiment suffered 4 officers and 81 enlisted men who were killed in action or who died of their wounds and 1 officer and 211 enlisted men who died of disease, for a total of 297 fatalities.

Commanders
Colonel Lyman Guinnip - Resigned October 17, 1862.
Colonel Sheridan P. Read - Killed in action at the Battle of Stone's River December 31, 1862.
Colonel Allen Buckner - Mustered out with the regiment.

See also
List of Illinois Civil War Units
Illinois in the American Civil War

Notes

References
The Civil War Archive

Units and formations of the Union Army from Illinois
1862 establishments in Illinois
Military units and formations established in 1862
Military units and formations disestablished in 1865